The men's High jump at the 2018 World Para Athletics European Championships was held at the Friedrich-Ludwig-Jahn-Sportpark in Berlin from 20 to 26 August.

Medalists

See also
List of IPC world records in athletics

References

High jump
2018 in men's athletics
High jump at the World Para Athletics European Championships